Live & Louder is the first live album by the Australian–American hard rock band The Dead Daisies. It was released on 19 May 2017, by Spitfire Music.

The Digipak version contains a massive photo booklet and a DVD, featuring behind the scene and tour documentaries.

Track listing
Songwriting credits via disc booklet.

DVD special features
 Behind the Scenes of "Live & Louder" documentary

Personnel
Credits are adapted from disc booklet.

 Doug Aldrich – guitar
 John Corabi – vocals, acoustic guitar
 David Lowy – guitar
 Marco Mendoza - bass, backing vocals
 Brian Tichy – drums

Production
 Doug Aldrich – production 
 Anthony Focx – mixing
 Tommy Dimitfoff – recording
 Howie Weinberg – mastering
 Gentry Studer – assistant mastering
 Sebastien Rohde  – album artwork, cover design
 Oliver Halfin – photography, additional filming
 David Edwards – management

Chart performance

References

2017 albums
The Dead Daisies albums